Jay Blackton (March 25, 1909 – January 8, 1994) was an American composer and conductor. In 1956 he won an Academy Award in the category Best Scoring of a Musical Picture for the film Oklahoma! and was also nominated for Guys and Dolls. He was the music director, orchestrator or arranger for more than 25 Broadway productions and national tours.

Born Jay Schwartzdorf in New York City, he studied piano and conducting at the Juilliard School. He began his career in opera, as an assistant conductor at New York Opera Comique and then as the conductor at St. Louis Municipal Opera from 1937 to 1942. In 1943 Rodgers and Hammerstein hired him to orchestrate and conduct Oklahoma! on Broadway, and he followed this engagement as music director and often orchestrator or arranger of such musicals as Annie Get Your Gun, Call Me Madam, Guys and Dolls, Hello, Dolly! and George M!. In addition, he toured with Bob Hope and others.

Blackton died in January 1994 of heart failure at the Granada Hills Community Hospital in Granada Hills, California, at the age of 84.

Selected filmography 
 The Merry Widow (1952)
 Oklahoma! (1955; co-won with Robert Russell Bennett and Adolph Deutsch)
 Guys and Dolls (1955; co-nominated with Cyril J. Mockridge)
 Androcles and the Lion (1967)

References

External links 

1909 births
1994 deaths
People from New York (state)
American male film score composers
American film score composers
American television composers
20th-century American composers
20th-century American male musicians
American conductors (music)
Best Original Music Score Academy Award winners